Mariane A. Collé Diop Fall (born 6 August 1981) is a Senegalese footballer who plays as a goalkeeper. She has been a member of the Senegal women's national team.

International career
Fall capped for Senegal at senior level during the 2012 African Women's Championship.

References

1981 births
Living people
Women's association football goalkeepers
Senegalese women's footballers
Senegal women's international footballers